Aq Kahriz may refer to:
 Aq Kahriz, East Azerbaijan
 Aq Kahriz, Marand, East Azerbaijan Province
 Aq Kahriz, Hamadan
 Aq Kahriz, Markazi
 Aq Kahriz, Razavi Khorasan
 Aq Kahriz Rural District, in Markazi Province